Enhydriodon is an extinct genus of otters known from Africa, Pakistan, and India that lived from the late Miocene to the early Pleistocene. It contains 9 confirmed species, 2 debated species, and at least a few other undescribed species from Africa. The genus belongs to the tribe Enhydriodontini (which also contains Sivaonyx and Vishnuonyx) in the subfamily Lutrinae. While Indian subcontinental species were moderate in size, some African species are the largest mustelids to have ever existed. Enhydriodon means “otter tooth” in Ancient Greek, and it is not a reference to the Enhydra genus but rather the fossilized dentition. It is classified as a member of the bunodont otters group, a categorical term referring to fossil otters with non-bladelike carnassials in the premolars or molars that lived from the Miocene to the Pleistocene and the sole extant sea otter of the Enhydra genus. The type species, E. sivalensis, was described from the Indian subcontinent, but over time, more species were described from the continent of Africa.

The exact sizes and lengths of Enhydriodon species are unknown given the lack of complete fossils of it and most related fossil otters. E. dikikae of Ethiopia and E. kamuhangerei of Uganda are both also defined as very large otters that could’ve weighed at least , making them potentially heavier than any known mustelid outside E. omoensis.

Enhydriodon is primarily studied for its dentition, its broad, bunodont carnassials seemingly emphasizing diets that would be consumed by crushing prey rather than shearing them like the modern sea otter and unlike most other extant otters. Its I3 teeth (or third incisors) are canine-like and are much larger than its other incisors (although still shorter than its canines), a trait unseen in extant and extinct otter genera. While it is widely accepted that Indian species of Enhydriodon consumed bivalves, assuming the diets of African species proves to be more complicated. Due to the scarcity of complete fossils, it is unknown whether African species were generally aquatic, semiaquatic, or terrestrial, so it proves difficult to assume their diets. The African species, based on their bunodont dentitions, are hypothesized to have consumed hard prey such as bivalves, catfish, reptiles, eggs, and even carrion. E. omoensis of the Lower Omo Valley in particular could've been a terrestrial locomotor that at least semiregularly hunted or scavenged terrestrial prey with C4 plant diets which if true makes its behavior unlike any extant otters despite their occasional tendencies to hunt smaller prey. It is unknown whether the species is an outlier amongst African bunodont otter species, but it has been suggested that Enhydriodon dikikae and Sivaonyx beyi were both large terrestrial bunodont otters of Africa as well.

The taxonomy of Enhydriodon has been complicated by both the disputes with similar bunodont otter genera like Sivaonyx and Paludolutra and its evolutionary relation to Enhydra. For instance, it was initially considered that Enhydriodon was related to Enhydra based on the former's so-called North American and European species, but they were largely later classified under the newly described Paludolutra genus, which was later considered an Enhydriodon subgenus but eventually redefined as a distinct genus unrelated to the two other genera. It also has taxonomic conflicts with the similar Sivaonyx due to proposed distinctions of the two genera that have been difficult to prove given the broken states of their fossilized teeth. As a result, several species that resided in Africa were initially considered part of the Sivaonyx genus but were eventually recategorized into Enhydriodon. Today, the Enhydriodontini tribe is considered evolutionarily closer to the modern Enhydra genus than any other known bunodont otter genus that may have gained bunodont dentition as a result of parallel evolution, but the extent to which they're closely related remains debated.

Research history

Enhydriodon was first described in 1868 in a collected memoir by Dr. Hugh Falconer when he erected the genus based on several craniums attributed to E. sivalensis in Siwalik Hills, India. He explained that the scientific name, meaning "otter tooth," is derived from the Ancient Greek terms ἐνυδρίς (otter) and ὀδούς (tooth) and is not a reference to the genus Enhydra, which has a similar derivation. According to Falconer, the Siwalik Hill fossils belonging to E. sivalensis were previously sorted under the name Amyxodon in 1835. Using this information and the available cranium specimens, he calculated the upper dental formula of E. sivalensis as 3:1:4, matching up more with the Enhydra genus. He described the upper carnassial of E. sivalensis as the most unique feature of its upper jaw, being nearly square and its coronal lobes being developed from conical mamelons unlike the two extant otter genera.

During the 19th and 20th centuries, more debated species of Enhydriodon such as E. campanii were introduced and more otter genera with bunodont dentition such as Sivaonyx and Vishnuonyx were described, creating a particularly complicated history for the earliest-discovered prehistoric otter genus. In 1931, Pilgrim described more fossils discovered in the Siwalik Hills, including a newer species named E. falconeri. He also implied that Enhydriodon and Sivaonyx, despite their similarities, were differentiated by the structure of the maxillary 4th premolar and apparent lack of the anterior upper premolar (P1) that's presumed to be reflected at the bottom jaw as well (both of which are debated up to today). In the same year that E. falconeri was described, Ernst Stromer described E. africanus of the late Pliocene, its fossil teeth being located in South Africa and the first described species from the continent of Africa. In 1976, Charles Repenning brought about the idea that Enhydriodon was related to the extant Enhydra genus due to the supposed species of the former being an evolutionary "branch" of "crab-eating otters" in Italy, Spain, and California, eventually leading to the modern sea otter. He correctly introduced the idea that Enhydra was related to Enhydriodon given their bunodont dentitions, but the supposed European "branch" of the Enhydriodon genus was later largely reclassified into a new genus named Paludolutra (Hürzeler & Engesser, 1976), although the newer genus name remained relatively obscure in the paleontological record until Pickford used it in his studies of bunodont otters.

The taxonomies of individual otter species and genera continued to evolve into the 21st century as more prehistoric otter species were being discovered while paleontologists continually debated the assignment of species (to genera). For instance, Paludolutra was originally reclassiied as a subgenus of Enhydriodon by Willemsen in 1999, but in 2005, Jorge Morales and Martin Pickford noted that the dental morphology of the Paludolutra genus was distinct enough to be its own genus (meaning that P. campanii, P. lluecai,  and P.  maremmana would no longer be sorted under Enhydriodon by technicality). Eventually, Paludolutra was considered a separate genus again. E. africanus, E. ekecaman, E. hendeyi, and E. kamuhangirei were all initially classified into the Sivaonyx genus, with the latter 3 being sorted around their respective times of discovery. The reclassification of African fossil bunodont otters into the Sivaonyx genus had brought about continuous debate regarding the practicality of the differences between Enhydriodon and Sivaonyx, with some researchers citing neutrality due to preferred focuses on researching the individual species instead of their genus placements. In 2022, the four species were eventually reclassified into the Enhydriodon genus. E. soriae was also initially sorted unto the Sivaonyx genus but was eventually assigned to the Enhydriodon genus, although its genus placement remains disputed. In 2005, Morales and Pickford sorted Enhydriodon into the newly created Enhydriodontini tribe, which they described as hosting genera of extinct bunodont otters from the Siwalik Hills and Africa including Vishnuonyx, Sivaonyx, and Paludolutra. Enhydra was explicitly excluded from the Enhydriodontini tribe despite its similarities, and Paludolutra was later reclassified as a sister taxon to the tribe. In 2007, Pickford corrected the supposed species E. aethiopicus (previously described in 2004) by transferring it to Pseudocivetta ingens,  an extinct member of the Viverridae family.

In 2011, a team of researchers described E. dikikae based on its remains of a partial skull and femurs in the Lower Awash of Dikika, Ethiopia. It was described as having a notably heavier skull (albeit broken) than other Enhydriodon species or the modern sea otter. It was deemed as the largest species of Enhydriodon until another species whose remains were also described to be from Ethiopia, E. omoensis, was described from the Lower Omo Valley in 2022.

Classification
 Enhydriodon belongs to the tribe Enhydriodontini in the subfamily Lutrinae, which first appeared in Eurasia and Africa during the late Miocene epoch. It is perhaps the most well-known prehistoric otter given its old taxonomic history and it being a primary source of comparisons to other bunodont otter genera. It is generally thought that the Enhydriodon was a result of a Miocene-Pleistocene trend that gave prehistoric otters bunodont teeth and large sizes compared to their extant relatives. It is classified as a member of the bunodont otters group, a categorical term commonly used by researchers that also includes Sivaonyx, Paludolutra, Vishnuonyx, Torolutra, Enhydritherium, Djourabus, Paralutra, Tyrrhenolutra, Siamogale and Enhydra. Bunodont otters are defined as large to very large otters of North America, Eurasia, and Africa that had robust dentition compared to most of the extant otters, generally allowing them to prey upon hard-armored creatures. Despite sharing the feature of bunodont dentition, there are at least several clades of bunodont otters belonging to this category rather than one, making the term a categorical one of otters during the same periods with similar dentitions rather than one that directly defines their taxonomic state.

The following cladogram defines some of the following extant and extinct otter species and genera within the subfamily Lutrinae based on a 50% majority consensus (the bunodont otter genera are bolded):

As shown in the above phylogeny, Enhydriodon shared a closer morphology with its other extinct relatives and Enhydra than the other extant otters that lack bunodont carnassial teeth (Lutra aonychoides was described as not being related to Lutra). Although the majority consensus tree displays a close morphological relation between Enhydriodon and Enhydra, the authors of the consensus tree also created a Bayesian inference tree proposing that Enhydra is a separate clade (Paralutra jaegeri was proposed as a separate clade as well). Regardless, they argued that Enhydra is closer to the Enhydriodontini tribe (Enhydriodon, Sivaonyx, and Vishnuonyx) than any other bunodont otter genus. The researchers explained that the acquisition of bunodont dentition occurred at least three times in the evolution of otters, reflected by the phylogeny tree's clades: in Sivaonyx-Enhydriodon-Enhydra, in Paludolutra-Enhydritherium, and in Siamogale. Nonbunodont otters likely branched out separate from bunodont otters during or before the Pliocene epoch, but their poor fossil records and restriction to Plio-Pleistocene deposits in comparison leave little understanding in their evolutionary phylogenies.

Description

Size
 Some Enhydriodon species, particularly a few that had resided in Africa, are the largest known mustelids to have ever existed based on weight estimates, but their precise sizes and weights remain unknown given the lack of complete specimens in their fossil records. Some species like E. latipes(?) are poorly studied compared to others and therefore lack confirmed size or weight estimates. It is generally estimated that some species of Enhydriodon are similar in weight to modern large-sized otters while others are estimated as much larger than them (It should also be noted that weight estimates are more often made for bunodont otters like Enhydriodon than size estimates, although size comparisons to modern animals may be referenced).

The two species of Enhydriodon native to the subcontinent of India had modest weight estimates, comparable with most other bunodont otter genera as well as extant otter genera. Dr. Hush Falconer's 1868 memoir described E. sivalensis as a lutrine animal the size of a panther. In 1932, Guy Pilgrim diagnosed E. falconeri as being smaller than E. sivalensis, although no size or weight estimates were offered for it by him. In 2007, Martin Pickford estimated E. sivalensis to be the largest prehistoric otter in India, ranging from  minimum to  maximum in body weight, its skull possibly being wolf-sized.

Africa's Enhydriodon species are estimated to be some of the largest species of otters to ever exist, reflecting on the Miocene-Pleistocene trend of bunodont otters growing larger than their nonbunodont cousins. Dr. Pickford described E. kamuhangirei of the Western Rift Valley, Uganda (at the time Sivaonyx kamuhangirei) to possibly exceed  in weight, making it the largest-known prehistoric otter at the time, although he mentioned that the undescribed fossil otters in Ethiopia (likely sorted later under E. dikikae and/or E. omoensis) could've possibly been larger than it. E. africanus and E. ekecaman are estimated to be of similar sizes to E. hendeyi. E. dikikae of Ethiopia is estimated to weigh  minimum and  maximum (the latter mentioned to be more likely), its holotype suggesting a bearlike size. It is also said to potentially be "lion-sized," making it the largest mustelid species to ever exist.

Dentition

Enhydriodon's dentition is well-defined by its broad, bunodont carnassials in the molars and premolars similar to the modern sea otter. The Enhydriodon and Sivaonyx species differences are usually attributed to dentition, so the premolar teeth or molar teeth fossils are examined to discern the two bunodont otter genera. The proposed genera differences (larger P4 hypocone, conical post-protocone cusps, and apparent lack of anterior upper premolars for Enhydriodon) by tooth measurements have been difficult to prove due to the fragmentary nature of the fossils and relative inconsistencies of tooth measurements/dimensions by species. The reclassification of all "African Sivaonyx" species other than S. beyi to Enhydriodon in 2022 has been attributed to "[a] metaconid higher than the protoconid on M1, presence of a carnassial notch and one or more cusps between the protocone and the hypocone on P4, and/or distolingual expansion on M1."

Enhydriodon as the latest-appearing genus is suggested to have the most bunodont dentition of the Enhydriodontini tribe, which includes the earliest-appearing Vishnuonyx and then Sivaonyx. Enhydriodon's dentition suggests a near suppression of carnassial functions in favor of crushing as the predominant function. The I3 (or third upper incisor) of Enhydriodon is much larger than its I1 (smallest incisor) and I2, appearing larger and more canine-like in comparison to Paludolutra and Enhydra. In comparison for most otters where the upper incisor is known, their third incisors are only marginally larger than their first and second incisors. The large I3 trait also applies to E. dikikae, which was described after Pickford's general description of the Enhydriodon genus as having a much larger I3 than I1 - I2 and being more conical in shape.

Skull

There are currently only two known partial skulls that are attributed to Enhydriodon: one of E. sivalensis of the Siwalik Hills and the other of E. dikikae of the Awash Valley. It is currently unknown whether the skulls' features of either species are well-representative of other species of Enhydriodon, but the known E. dikikae and E. sivalensis skulls have somewhat different features from each other.

The E. sivalensis skull, identified as belonging to a fully-grown individual, is relatively well-preserved with identifiable temporal crests, frontal, maxillae, premaxillae, nasal, muzzle, and palatine bone parts. However, it has also suffered from wear and being slightly twisted clockwise. Most notably, the dental arch is complete, although the left M1 and left I1 are both missing and most of the teeth are broken from their crowns. It has a large brain case, a broad and short muzzle, and a large nasal opening. Outlines of the orbits around the skull's frontals can also be identified.

The broken skull belonging to E. dikikae contains a short and non-prognathic snout, parts of the orbits, a nearly complete upper dental arch that is missing both I1s and a right I2, and part of the lower jaw. The muzzle on the E. dikikae skull is short, a small anterior orbital border positioned just above the posterior side of a canine. The front part of the snout is identified as short, thereby comparable with the snout of Enhydra. Although the evolution of bunodont otters like Enhydriodon are unclear, it is proposed that E. dikikae's short snout and very large canine size both clearly make the species different-looking and more evolutionarily derived than E. sivalensis.

Paleobiology
 
As fossil bunodont otter genera including Enhydriodon generally lack complete specimens, their locomotion and ecological niches remain uncertain. A common theory of the Indian subcontinental species of Enhydriodon is that based on their robust, bunodont dentition similar to Enhydra, E. falconeri and E. sivalensis were both specialized in their diets that they commonly ate shellfish. This claim is likely made from analogies of the diet of Enhydra (abalones and marine bivales) and ‘’Aonyx’’ (freshwater crabs), but there is little paleontological evidence to directly support this claim. Regardless, it is suggested that the thick enamel in the posterior dentition of Indian Enhydriodon species makes them more molluscivorous than cancrivorous (in contrast, Indian Sivaonyx species are suggested to combine shearing functions of the carnassials with overall bunodont crowns to prey more on crustaceans, although bivalves could potentially have been secondary prey for it). The possibility of Enhydriodon preying on bivalves is supported by the presence of fossilized freshwater bivalve genera Parreysia and Lamellidens in the same locations as them, both of which are common throughout the entire Siwalik sedimentary column which spans from 15-2 mya, ranging with the presence of the Enhydriodontini tribe in the Indian subcontinent (India and Pakistan).

The larger Enhydriodon species in the African continent are suggested to have different prey from their Indian subcontinental counterparts. It is suggested that they could've preyed upon a wider variety of foods in addition to their primary prey. Their bunodont dentition likely would not have limited genera like Enhydriodon from consuming softer prey. One suggested type of prey is large fish with hard external coverings such as catfish. Several catfish genera were present in Africa starting from their first appearances during the late Miocene coinciding with the presence of Enhydriodon, including extant genera Clarotes, Bagrus, Auchenoglanis, and Chrysichthys and the extinct genus Nkondobagrus. Crabs have been excluded as potential prey for African species of Enhydriodon species like E. dikikae given the lack of fossilized crabs at Dikika, unlikeliness for biomasses of crabs to support populations of large otters, and apparent incompatibility for enamel dentition. The overall lack of crabs in Africa and the large presence of catfish supports the claim that at least some African Enhydriodon species preyed on the latter, which were particularly abundant, easy targets for carnivores. Fast-swimming fish might've been unlikely to have been a regular source of its diet due to the emphasis on dentition meant to crush hard food in addition to large animals likely not catching having the ability to catch fast prey. Other armored prey, such as juvenile crocodiles, turtles, and ostrich eggs, are also suggested prey of E. dikikae.

Femora and dental remains of African Enhydriodon could possibly hint at a semiaquatic plus terrestrial lifestyle, meaning that it could've eaten both aquatic prey and terrestrial prey. The speculations of Enhydriodon's lifestyle, however, have been contradictory to each other, so there is, therefore, no majority consensus on it. In 2008, it was speculated that smaller species of Enhydriodon (E. species from West Turkana, Kenya and E. hendeyi from Langebaanweg, South Africa) based on their smaller femur sizes were more locomotor generalists similar to most mustelids while larger species (E. species from Hadar, Ethiopia and a species eventually classified as E. omoensis from Omo, Ethiopia) were fully aquatic since their femur structures shared similarities to Enhydra. However, the Omo and Hadar femoras' proximal ends pointed out to a more aquatic nature than most lutrines, while their relative lengths resembled that of terrestrial generalist mustelids, including semiaquatic otters. Because of the hypothesis that S. beyi was a terrestrial predator, E. dikikae is speculated to be mostly terrestrial based on its shared fossil location with both aquatic and terrestrial fauna at Dikika. The diets of E. ekecaman and E. cf. dikikae in Kanapoi, Kenya remain unclear as their fossil materials, uncovered in the 1960s, were not specifically pronounced beyond "Kanapoi," which future research would have to cover. It is also pointed out that African species of bunodont otters like Enhydriodon and Sivaonyx were always found in sites in association with permanent bodies of water as opposed to the Upper Laetolil Beds in Laetoli, Tanzania which lacked such a feature, putting a question to the extent of the possibly terrestrial lifestyle of African Enhydriodon and Sivaonyx species.

E. hendeyi was analyzed based on femoral robustness index (FRI) and the femoral epicondylar index (FEI), in which its FRI value is comparable to the extinct S. beyi, Enhydritherium, and Satherium (the latter two which are analogous to the large Enhydra and Pteronura respectively and have larger values in femoral indexes than most other extant otters) while its FEI value is analogous to the extant African clawless otter and Asian small-clawed otter.  Since both the African clawless otter and Asian small-clawed otter are typically associated as less linked to water bodies and being the least aquatic of extant otters, it is hypothesized that E. hendeyi and S. beyi were both semiaquatic locomotors that had lower associations with water than aquatic locomotors Enhydritherium and Satherium, although S. beyi was said to be more terrestrial than E. hendeyi. Meanwhile, the lowest values correspond with E. dikikae, which has similar values to terrestrial semifossorial musteloids such as the American badger and the striped skunk, thereby reinforcing the hypothesis that E. dikikae was a more generalized terrestrial mustelid similar to S. beyi.

With the overall lack of consensus on the lifestyle of African Enhydriodon species considered, a 2022 study on E. omoensis measured the stable carbon and oxygen isotope ratios of Enhydriodon species in comparison to extant terrestrial mammals such as felids, hyaenids, and bovids along with semiaquatic mammals such as hippopotamids. The authors explained that using oxygen isotopic ratios, or δ18O, can be used to understand a taxon's dependency on water, in which extant aquatic and semiaquatic taxa, which includes river and sea otters, have significantly lower oxygen isotopic deviations compared to terrestrial carnivorans. The researchers who studied E. omoensis found that its tooth enamel δ18O values had a standard deviation of 2.7%, falling outside the δ18O standard deviations of the sea otter (Enhydra lutris), and the North American river otter (Lontra canadensis), which were recorded to be 0.6% and 0.3%-0.9% respectively. The standard deviation of Omo Enhydriodon aligns itself more within the range of extant terrestrial carnivorans such as hyaenids, suggesting that E. omoensis was not as semiaquatic as initially thought. The results of the study as a result contradict the 2008 assumption that the Omo Enhydriodon species was aquatic.

It was also initially considered that the diet of Enhydriodon could've been Etheria elliptica, which was present in the continent at the same time range. Based on investigations using carbon stable isotopes, a diet of pure oysters would result in an enamel δ13C value of −11.3%. The diet of E. omoensis, however, was not based purely on Etheria as its minimum-maximum carbon values (-9.7% to -4.7%) are ~2-7% more positive than the expected pure oyster diet value. Its enamel δ13C values fall within the range of mixed C3-C4 feeders, only partly falling within the range of diets of aquatic feeders of C3 plants such as fish, turtles, or bivalves. The δ13C standard deviation of Omo Enhydriodon, however, falls outside the range of studied extant freshwater otter populations. It is instead considered that E. omoensis consumed terrestrial prey with a C4 diet at least semi-regularly via hunting and/or scavenging. The large bunodont dentition of the species suggests durophageous abilities that allow it to feed on carrion, including bones, in potentially a similar manner to hyeanas or bone-crushing mustelids.

Paleoecology

Pakistan and India

E. falconeri and E. sivalensis, while both Enhydriodon species that were present in the Siwalik Hills in India and Pakistan during the Neogene period, did not coexist for the same epochs based on their formation deposit appearances. E. falconeri remains were present at the Nagri Formation (Dhok Milan and Sethi Nagri, Pakistan) and the Dhok Pathan Formation (Dhok Pathan and Hasnot, Pakistan), both formations dating back to the middle Siwaliks representing late Miocene. The species was also present at the Tatrot Formation (Tatrot, India) of the Upper Siwaliks from the early or middle Pliocene. In the Nagri and Dhok Pathan Formations, E. falconeri was shown to have existed with several archaic mammalian carnivorous families that went extinct before the Pliocene, such as the hyaenodont Dissopsalis and the amphicyonids Amphicyon and Arctamphicyon. The early otter species also existed with various extinct carnivorous members of extant families during the late Miocene such as other mustelids (Sivaonyx, Promellivora, and Plesiogulo), ursids Agriotherium and Indarctos, felids (Mellivorodon, Felis, the Pseudaelurus cat Leptofelis, and machairodont cats Megantereon and Paramachairodus), hyaenids (percrocutinae hyaenids Dinocrocuta and Percrocuta, ictitheres Hyaenictitherium and Ictitherium, Lepthyaena, Lycyaena, and Adcrocuta), viverrids (Viverra, Aeluropsis, and Vishnuictis), and the mongoose Herpestes. It is suggested that the extinction of the amphicyonids and percrocutids left empty predatory niches that were quickly filled other hyaenid genera, which became highly diversified and coexisted with felids in the subcontinent.

Other extinct members of extant and extinct mammalian families were found in the Nagri Formation and thereby existed with E. falconeri including bovids (Tragoportax, Miotragocerus, Selenoportax, Pachyportax, and Gazella), giraffids Giraffokeryx and Giraffa, anthracothere Merycopotamus, tragulines Dorcabune and Dorcatherium, the suid Propotamochoerus, the equid Hipparion, rhinoceroses (Chilotherium, Subchilotherium, and Brachypotherium), the chalicothere Chalicotherium, proboscideans Gomphotherium and Pentalophodon, the hominid ape Sivapithecus, and the rodent Rhizomys. An extinct reptilian species of gharial, Gavialis lewisi (?), is reported from the Dhok Pathan Formation of Pakistan and is Pliocene in age.

Mammal genera that were found in the Dhok Pathan Formation are generally consistent with the mammal genera found within the Nagri Formation but also include bovids Taurotragus and Elaschistoceros, the giraffid Bramatherium, cervids (Rucervus, Cervus, and Axis), anthracothere Microbunodon, suids (Tetraconodon, Listriodon, Hippopotamodon, and Sivachoerus), the equid Sivalhippus, the rhinoceros Aceratherium, proboscideans Choerolophodon and cf. Paratetralophodon, the old world monkey Cercopithecus, and the old world porcupine Hystrix.

The transition from the middle Miocene to the late Miocene reflected a period in which the evergreen to deciduous tropical forests once covering a large part of the Indian subcontinent shrank and were replaced by grasslands because of global cooling, drier conditions, and the intensification of Asian monsoons. A change from the Nagri floodplains to the Dhok Pathan floodplains suggests less draining in the fluvial system of the latter compared to the former with Dhok Pathan's smaller rivers having more seasonal flow than before. This reflects the general trend of late Miocene climate forcing resulting in more seasonality, bringing about large faunal turnovers. Hipparion equids had newly arrived to the Siwaliks by 10.7 Ma as immigrants from North America and became abundant, being representative of the start of the major faunal turnovers in the area, although the turnovers and extinctions did not start until 400 Kyr after their arrival. The drier and more seasonal climates along with fluvial changes gradually brought about larger, open woodlands predominantly consisting of C4 plants near the Potwar Miocene rivers while communities exclusively or predominantly consisting of C3 plants diminished greatly and eventually disappeared by 7.0 Ma along with the C3 feeders that depended more on closed vegetation such as several giraffid members of Giraffokeryx, Bramatherium, and Giraffa. Tragulids and suids both faced substantial declines during the period while bovids generally increased in relative abundance. The hominid ape Sivapithecus, deinotheres such as Deinotherium, and chalicotheres also faced extinction from rarity and declines in diversity within the late Miocene of the Siwaliks. Sivapithecus became extinct by around 8.4 Ma while deinotheres became locally extinct from the Indian subcontinent around the late Miocene as a result of the fragmentation of closed habitats in favor of open habitats that would eliminate food for C3 browsers and frugivores. By 6.5 Ma, only one frugivorous mammal lineage and one browsing mammal lineage remained amongst herbivorous mammalian fauna, the remaining tragulids and suids seemingly incorporating C4 vegetation into their diets.

The carnivoran fossil records of the Tatrot Formation in India are scarce, but amongst the extinct members that existed with E. falconeri in the Pliocene were the otter Amblonyx barryi, the machairodont cat Metailurus, and hyeana Lycyaena. Herbivorous mammals found at the Tatrot Formation on the Potwar Plateau include the highly diverse bovids (Kobus, Antilope, Sivacobus, Vishnucobus, Gazella, Proamphibos, Sivoryx, and Leptobos), cervids (Cervus, Axis, and Rucervus), suids Hippohyus and Potamochoerus, proboscideans Stegodon and Elephas, the equid Eurygnathohippus, the anthracothere Merycopotamus, the hippopotamus Hexaprotodon, the giraffid Sivatherium, and the tragulid Vishnumeryx. The porcupine Hystrix and the rabbit Alilepus were both relatively newer immigrants of the Indian subcontinent that had coexisted with the endemic bamboo rats (Rhizomys), their remains being found at the Dhok Pathan and Tatrot formations. The crocodilians Crocodylus and Rhamphosuchus, the pelican Pelecanus, turtles (Batagur, Geoclemys, Hardella, and Pangshura), and the freshwater crab Acanthopotamon are reported from at least the Tatrot or Pinjor Formations of India as well, indicating an active freshwater habitat that E. falconeri and later E. sivalensis were present in.

Amongst carnivoran taxa, Enhydriodon is the longest-lasting caniform genus to have ever existed within the Siwaliks of the Indian subcontinent, identified from the Nagri-Pinjor formations. However, the species identified within the Pinjor Formation of the Plio-Pleistocene epochs is E. sivalensis, which suggests that E. falconeri after a long time of relative success eventually might have gone through anagenesis by the Pliocene. Other carnivoran genera that were found in the Pinjor Formation included the newly arrived canids Canis and Sivacyon, mustelids (Mellivora, Sinictis, and Amblonyx), ursids Agriotherium and Melursus, felids (Megantereon, Panthera, Sivafelis, and Felis), hyaenids (Crocuta, Hyaenictis, and Pliocrocuta), and the viverrids Vishnuictis and Viverra. Other mammalian genera found within the Pinjor Formation includes the hedgehog Chandysorex, the hominoid Homo (specifically Homo erectus(?)), the old world monkeys Theropithecus and Procynocephalus, rodents (Nesokia, Rattus, Hystrix, Mus, Cremnomys, Golunda, Dilatomys, Hadromys, Tatera, Rhizomys, and Bandicota), the lepoid Caprolagus, proboscideans Elephas and Stegodon, the horse Equus, the rhinoceroses Coelodonta(?) (=Punjabitherium(?)) and Rhinoceros, suids Potamochoerus and Sus, the deer Cervus, the giraffid Sivatherium, and bovids (Sivacapra, Damalops, Oryx, Sivacobus, Antilope, Hemibos, Bubalus, Leptobos, Bison, and Bos).

Ethiopia

E. dikikae and E. omoensis were large lutrine species found in different locations within modern-day Ethiopia. E. dikikae fossils were found within the bottom two sequences of the  Hadar Formation of the Lower Awash Valley, Ethiopia, indicating that its fossils range from 4 Ma to 3.2 Ma. Fossils of E. omoensis were located at the Usno Formation and Shungura Formation of the Lower Omo Valley in Ethiopia, the fossils ranging from 3.44 Ma to 2.53 Ma. E. dikikae was named after the Dikikae Basal Member of the Hadar Formation while E. omoensis had its name derived from the Lower Omo Valley.

There are four members of the Dikika composite sequence as part of the Pliocene Hadar Formation, from base to top: the Basal, Sidi Hakoma, Denen Dora, and Kada Hadar members. All together, they are dated to ca. 3.5-2.9 Ma and are best known for the numerous remains of Australopithecus afarensis. E. dikikae fossils are known from the formation's Basal and Sigi Hakoma members and are unknown in the other top two members. 

Based on methods of determining paleoenvironments such as ecomorphological analysis, dental microwear of bovids, and carbon and oxygen isotopes of enamel, the Basal Member (BM) has the greatest abundance of bovids and suids in the Hadar Formation, suggesting that the environments of which they were present in were possibly woody grasslands as well as riverine forests. The Aepycerotini were common within the member, fitting with the tribe's preference for ecotonal habitats between grasslands and woodlands.

The Sidi Hakoma Submember 1 (SH-1), ranging from ~3.45 to 3.35 Ma, had similar fauna and thereby similar habitats to other members within the Hadar Formation but also likely included wetlands in certain regions. Taxa such as a species within the forest-dwelling Cephalophini tribe and five species of primates were recovered from the member, further indicating a large riverine forest with, predominantly, woodlands in the surrounding area. Aepyceros was the most abundant bovid, and SH-1 had the lowest proportion of grazing bovids at any sub-member of the Hadar Formation. The vegetation of SH-1 might've closely resembled those at the Guinea or Sudanese savannas that interdigitate with the central African rainforest, which creates habitat mosaics of grasslands, woodlands, and some forest belts. The ostracod assemblage of the Basal and Sidi Hakoma Members indicate sources of freshwater input, in which their shells also indicate only a three-month dry season, characteristic of the central African savannas. The single dry season, indicating a nine-month rainy season, is a distinctive factor of the Sidi Hakoma member from the modern climate in East Africa, which has a bimodal dry season format (two dry seasons) rather than a single one. The Sidi Hakoma Submember 2 (SH-2) is similar to SH-1 and is thought to have been associated with woodlands with some grassy plains, of which Aepycerotini was the most common.

Sidi Hakoma Submember 3 (SH-3) indicates the presence of woodlands and grasslands with more lakeside wetlands compare to the previous sub-members, with increased presences of reduncine bovids and the highest abundance of tragelaphin bovids, which indicate either more closed habitats or wetlands. It also contains the largest micromammal assemblages of extant murid genera such as the extant Acomys, Golunda and Oenomys and the extinct Saidomys, of which Golunda is now extinct in Africa. Sidi Hakoma Submember 4 indicates wetland habitats that surround lakes within drier environments. A further increase of Reduncinae bovids and a decrease in alcelaphin bovids indicates said lakeshore environments and surrounding wetlands. The bovid abundance data suggests similar amounts of tree cover for SH-3 and SH-4 with the difference being that the latter was slightly drier than the former.

 

The Hadar Formation represents many fossils of Australopithecus afarensis, most notably the partial skeleton known as "Lucy". The aggregate time span of the species is at least 0.7 myr, from 3.7 Ma to 3.0 Ma. The Hadar Formation is also known for its representation of a great diversity of bovid species that represented most major tribes in Africa. The bovid tribes that were found in the formation included the Aepycerotini (Aepyceros), Alcelaphini (Damalborea and Parmularius), Antilopini (Gazella), Bovini (Ugandax and Pelorovis(?)), Caprini (Budorcas), Cephalophini, Hippotragini (Oryx), Neotragini (Raphicerus(?) and Madoqua), Reduncini (Kobus), and Tragelaphini (Tragelaphus). Artiodactyls outside the bovid family were present within the formation as well, namely the giraffids Giraffa and Sivatherium, Hippopotamus, and suids (Kolpochoerus, Notochoerus, and Nyanzachoerus). While a definitive list of carnivorans found within the Hadar Formation has yet to be made, confirmed genera that were found within the Hadar Formation include canids Canis and Nyctereutes, felids (Dinofelis, Leptailurus, Felis, Homotherium, and Panthera), hyaenids (Chasmaporthetes, Crocuta, Hyaena, Ikelohyena, and cf. Pliocrocuta), herpestids Herpestes and cf. Helogale, mustelids Mellivora and cf. Poecilogale, and the viverrid cf. Civettictis. Other mammals within the formation outside the artiodactyl and carnivoran families include a bat indet. (indeterminate), the leporid Lepus, the equid Eurygnathohippus, rhinoceroses Ceratotherium and Diceros, old world primates (Parapapio, Theropithecus, and Cercopithecoides), proboscideans (the deinothere Deinotherium and elephants Elephas, Loxodonta, and Mammuthus), old world porcupines Hystrix and Xenohystrix, murid rodents (Gerbilliscus, Acomys, Golunda, Oenomys, Praomys, Saidomys,  Millardia, and Mus), the spalacid Tachyoryctes, a squirrel indet., and an aardvark species. Taxons within other classes are present within the Hadar Formation as well, such as birds (Plectropterus, Balearica, Anhinga, and Struthio) and reptiles (Crocodylus, Python, Varanus, and Bitis).

References

Otters
Prehistoric mustelids
Miocene mustelids
Fossil taxa described in 1868
Miocene mammals of Africa
Pliocene mammals of Africa
Pleistocene mammals of Africa
Miocene mammals of Asia
Pliocene mammals of Asia
Taxa named by Hugh Falconer
Prehistoric carnivoran genera